13 is the thirteenth solo album from American musician Brian Setzer. It was released in 2006 on Surfdog Records, and contained the Japanese hit single "Back Streets Of Tokyo". Setzer had originally intended for the album to have one direction, or sound, but after thinking about how The Beatles' albums were so diverse, he decided to include many different styles on the album.

Brian Setzer and Slim Jim Phantom, who appears on "Really Rockabilly", were both in the Stray Cats. "We Are The Marauders" was written by Brian Setzer for the rockabilly band The Marauders, who opened for the Brian Setzer Orchestra in 2006. The song appears on their self-titled album.

Track listing

Limited Edition
Special edition 12" LPs of the album were available from May 2007. These were available in three colours (red, white and blue) in a red, embossed cover.

Chart positions

Album

Single

Single

"Back Streets of Tokyo" (Japan) – Credited as 'Brian Setzer Vs Hotei' (August 23, 2006)

Personnel

 Brian Setzer – lead vocals, electric guitar, electric bass, banjo, ukulele
 Ronnie Crutcher – double bass
 Bernie Dresel – drums
 Stefan Kac – tuba
 Jon Duncan – organ
 Arlan Shierbaum – B-3
 Robert Chevrier – piano
 Slim Jim Phantom – drums on "Really Rockabilly"
 Tomoyasu Hotei – guitar and vocals on "Back Streets Of Tokyo", background vocals
 Julie Reiten – vocals on "Don't Say You Love Me", background vocals
 Adam Ayan – Mastering
 Jeff Peters and Brent Sigmeth – Engineering
 Zack (the knife) Hollander and Jon Diederich – Asst. Engineering
 Tomoyasu Hotei – Production on "Back Streets of Tokyo"

References

2006 albums
Brian Setzer albums
Surfdog Records albums
Albums produced by Dave Darling
Roots rock albums